The 1998 Patriot League men's basketball tournament was played at Alumni Hall in Annapolis, Maryland after the conclusion of the 1997–98 regular season. Number two seed Navy defeated top seed , 93–85 in the championship game, to win its third Patriot League Tournament title. The Midshipmen earned an automatic bid to the 1998 NCAA tournament as #16 seed in the East region.

Format
All seven league members participated in the tournament, with teams seeded according to regular season conference record. Play began with the quarterfinal round, with the top seed receiving a bye to the semifinal round.

Bracket

References

Tournament
Patriot League men's basketball tournament
Patriot League men's basketball tournament
Patriot League men's basketball tournament
Patriot League men's basketball tournament